Sipora Gurung (Nepali: सिपोरा गुरुङ) is a Nepalese national women athlete, volleyball player, actress and beauty pageant winner. She is top 5 finalist of Miss Nepal 2013 & winner of Miss Talent. She was born and raised in Pokhara. She is the youngest daughter of Moti Lal Gurung. She got recognition as the best volleyball player of Nepal at the age of 16. At the age of 13, she became the youngest player in 10th South Asian Games held in Sri Lanka, also won bronze medal for Nepal. She sustained knee injury during a volleyball match at age 18 and had since been unable to play and was out of court. She was also the Nepal champion of 200m and 400m (under 16). Her name translates beautiful bird in Hebrew language.

Education
She passed SLC (School Leaving Certificate)  from Fishtail Higher Secondary Boarding School of Pokhara. She graduated high school, and is known to be diligent with her studies.

Filmography

Awards and achievements
 Winner with best player in 83rd Chaitey Dashain Mela and 2nd Sunpadali Mahotsav, Arwabijaye-2 Kaski, 2062
 Runner up with the best player in Nepal Adharsha Cup, Kaski, 2062
 Winner in Kaski Jilla Iistariya Volleyball Pratiyogita, Kaski, 2004
 Second runner up in Pataley Channgo Cup, Kaski, 2062
 Winner in 200m, 400m, 4*100 relay, 4*400 relay, Best Athletes of the Tournament, with runner up in girls volleyball, 20th Birendrashield Pratigyogita, 2062, Kaski
 Runner-up in 3rd Aadarsha Cup, Kaski, 2063
 Winner with Best Spiker in 8th Pokhara Street Festival, Reban, Kaski, 2063
 Winner with Best Player in Myagdi Mahotsab and Maghey Sankrati Mela, Beni, 2063
 Runner up with Best Player of the Tournament in volleyball in Baglung Mahotsav, Baglung, 2063
 Winner in long jump, 400m and 4*100 relay in Pabson Sports Meet, Kaski, 2063
 Winner in 100m, 400m, long jump and volleyball in Zonal Open Sports Festival, Kaski, 2064
 Runner-up with Best Spiker in 9th Pokharastreet Festival, Kaski, 2007-2008
 Winner in 200m, 400m, 4*100 relay and 1st in volleyball in 11th Pabson Sports Meet, Kaski, 2008
 Runner up in volleyball and in football with Best Player of the Tournament, Republic Cup, Kaski, 2064
 Winner with the Rising Player of Nepal in 14th Women's and 24th Men's National Volleyball Competition, Hetauda, 2064
 Runner-up with Best Player of the Tournament, 2nd Chhantayal Cup open male and female volleyball tournament, Kathmandu, 2064
 Winner in 200m, 400m, long jump, 4*100 relay with Best Athletes of the Tournament in Bidyalaya Istariya Khelkud Pratiyogita, Kaski, 2064
 Runner up with Best Spiker in Dashain and Tihar Mela, Tilahar-6 dimuwa, 2064
 Winner with Best Player of the Tournament, Silver Jubilee Celebration, LSHSS, Kaski, 2064
 Winner in 200m, long jump, runner-up 400m and in volleyball, 1st Republican Sports Festival, Kaski, 2064
 3rd runner Up in 3 km marathon, PTMA, Kaski, 2064
 Runner up in Girls' Interschool Volleyball Championship, Lamachaur, Kaski,2064
 Winner with best player in 4th Nepal Adarsha Cup, Kaski, 2064
 Winner in 200m, 400m, long jump and volleyball in School-Level Sportsmeet, Kaski, 2064
 Winner in 5th National Games, Kathmandu,2065
 Runner up with Best Server and Best Spiker in 3rd Dhorpatan Bluesky Cup IME Women's Volleyball Double League Championship, Kathmandu, 2065
 Winner in Girls Interschool Volleyball Championship, Lamachaur, Kaski, 2065
 Winner in 400m and long jump in 1st President Cup, Kaski, 2065
 Winner with Best Player of the Tournament in 3rd Grand National Republican Sports Festival, Palpa, 2065
 Runner up with Best Player of the Tournament and Best Spiker in 2nd Dhorpatan Bluesky Cup women's double league championship, Kathmandu, 2065
 Winner in Aakhil Cup Inter school volleyball championship, Kaski, 2065
 Winner in Long Jump and Volleyball 5th National Games, Zonal Championship, Kaski, 2065
 Winner in high jump, long jump and 2nd in 400m, Tamywan Rajya Istariya Athletics Pratiyogita, Kaski, 2065
2066 Winner in 8th girls 31st boys Interschool National Volleyball Championship, Kathmandu, 2066
 Runner up with Best Play of the Tournament in 4th Dhorpatan Bluesky Cup Women's Double League Championship, Kathmandu, 2066
 Winner in 200m, 400m, long jump, 4*100m relay and volleyball in Interschool Level Competition, Kaski, 2066
 Winner in 4*400m and runner up in Interschool level Boys' and Girls' Athletics Championship, Kaski, 2066
 Runner up in 1st Women's and Men's National League Championship, Kathmandu, 2066
 Winner in 200m, 400m, Runner-up in 4*100 m relay in 28th School Level National Athletics Championship, Kathmandu, 2066
 Second runner up in 10th South Asian Games, Sri Lanka, 2006
 Winner with Best Player of the Tournament in 7th Interschool National Girls Volleyball Championship, Kathmandu, 2064
 Second runner up in 5th Dhorpatanh Cup Blue Sky Women's Double League Championship, Kathmandu,2067
 Facilitated with the award Rastiya Bal Prativa Puraskar, 2065

References

External links
 Miss Nepal 2013 Profile
 Miss Nepal Official Website
 Sipora Gurung photos

Nepalese female models
1993 births
Living people
People from Pokhara
Nepalese Buddhists
Nepalese women's volleyball players
South Asian Games bronze medalists for Nepal
South Asian Games medalists in volleyball
Gurung people